Copybook may refer to:

 Copybook (calligraphy), a book containing examples of calligraphic script
 Copybook (comics), a self-published and self-made work by fans or original fiction published using a copy machine
 Copybook (education), a book used in education that contains examples of handwriting and blank space for learners to imitate
 Copybooks, files that are mentioned in include directives in many programming languages